Marion Peak is a remote  mountain summit located in Kings Canyon National Park, in Fresno County of northern California, United States.

History
The first ascent of the summit was made July 22, 1902, by Joseph Nisbet LeConte and Curds Lindley via the east slope. They climbed it in order to scout a possible route to the northern Palisades. The  Northwest Ridge was first climbed August 11, 1945, by Art Reyman.

Marion Peak is named in association with Marion Lake below is northern slopes. Marion Lake was named by Joseph N. LeConte for his wife, Helen Marion Gompertz LeConte (1865–1924), who accompanied him on this 1902 pioneering trip up Cartridge Creek. This mountain's name has been officially adopted by the United States Board on Geographic Names.

Climate
According to the Köppen climate classification system, Marion Peak is located in an alpine climate zone. Most weather fronts originate in the Pacific Ocean, and travel east toward the Sierra Nevada mountains. As fronts approach, they are forced upward by the peaks, causing them to drop their moisture in the form of rain or snowfall onto the range (orographic lift). Precipitation runoff from this mountain drains into tributaries of the Kings River.

See also

 List of mountain peaks of California

References

External links
 Weather forecast: Marion Peak

Mountains of Fresno County, California
Mountains of Kings Canyon National Park
North American 3000 m summits
Mountains of Northern California
Sierra Nevada (United States)